Chris Meigh-Andrews is a video artist, writer and curator from Essex, England, whose work often includes elements of renewable energy technology in tandem with moving image and sound. He is currently Professor Emeritus in Electronic & Digital Art at the University of Central Lancashire and Visiting Professor at the Centre for Moving image Research (CMIR) at the University of the West of England.

Education and early career

Born in Essex, England on 30 July 1952, Meigh-Andrews lived in Montreal, Canada from 1957-75. Upon his return to England, he studied photography, film & video at the London College of Printing. His first art exhibition was part of the group photography show New British Image at Newcastle's Side Gallery in 1977. Beginning in 1978, Meigh-Andrews began producing art using video as a medium, creating solo and collaborative exhibitions that expanded into sculptural installations. From 1981-1983, he attended Goldsmiths, earning an MA in Fine Art. In 2001, he was awarded a PhD from the Royal College of Art.

The theme of renewable energy
Many of the artist's more recent works have featured renewable energy sources intended to power the works and interact with the gallery space. 1994's Perpetual Motion featured a video monitor powered by a wind turbine, with the wind being supplied by a fan plugged into the gallery's power. Mothlight (1998) and Mothlight II (2001) featured solar-powered video screens powered by halogen lights. His 2002 installation 2002, For William Henry Fox Talbot (The Pencil of Nature) consisted of a solar-powered video camera at Lacock Abbey, reproducing a live image of William Henry Fox Talbot's 1835 photograph of a latticed window at the abbey (the world's oldest surviving photograph), then transmitted to the Victoria and Albert Museum in London. 2004's Interwoven Motion was an outdoor video installation in Grizedale Forest, Cumbria, made up of a wind- and solar-powered camera and screen, it produced video images displayed on a weatherproof LCD display. 2005's Resurrection featured a series of solar panels mounted on a dead tree, powering a video display of the tree in its living form. And his 2011 installation Sunbeam used solar panels to power the projection of images of the sun from NASA’ s Solar Dynamics Observatory.

Other recent works
In 2009, Meigh-Andrews launched The Monument Project (Si Monumentum Requiris Circumspice). A digital video installation that ran online for three years, it consisted of a digital video camera mounted on the Monument in the City of London. The installation streamed 360-degree panoramic time lapse sequences of the city online, with displays modified by a computer in response to changes in weather. His 2012 solo project, In Darwin's Garden, was a web-based installation exhibited by the online journal Leonardo Electronic Almanac. Recorded in the grounds of the Down House in Kent, England (Charles Darwin's family home), the exhibition focused on an old mulberry tree growing behind the house. In 2013, the artist created "Aeolian Processes", an outdoor solar powered sound installation for "Art In Your Park" in Highfields Park, Nottingham, which reflected once again his underlying impulse to explore “the role of machine and its impact on human perception.”  Likewise, participating in the project "La Lune: Energy Producing Art" at Long Reef in Sydney, Australia, he installed "Aeolian Processes II". 
Meigh-Andrews is currently Professor Emeritus at the University of Central Lancashire, directing the Electronic and Digital Art Unit (EDAU). He taught at the university from 1986-2012, first as the head of Time Based Media (1986-2000), then as a reader in Electronic and Digital Art (2000-2007), as the founder of the EDAU in 2004, and as a full professor in 2007.

Awards and fellowships

Meigh-Andrews was Arts Council of England International Artist Fellow in Kraków from 2003-2004. He won a research endowment from the National Endowment of Science, Technology and the Arts (NESTA) in 2004. He has received British Council Travel Awards to visit Amsterdam (2004),  Poland and Malta (2005). In 2010, he was awarded the Daiwa Anglo-Japanese Foundation Award, a travel grant to visit Tokyo, Kyoto and Nagoya to research into early artists' video in Japan.

Solo exhibitions
  Sculpting with Light & Time: Video and Installations 1978-2014, The Minories Galleries, November, 2014
 In Darwin’s Garden, Leonardo Electronic Almanac, August, 2012
 The Monument Project (Si Monumentum Requiris Circumspice), Project Launch, Nunnery Gallery, London, March 2009* The Basement, Newcastle upon Tyne, 1982
 Wawel z Mostu Debnickiego, Galeria Sztuki Wspólczesnej, Kraków, 2004
 Mothlight II, 291 Gallery, London, June 2001
 Fenêtre Digitale, Galeri Brighi, Paris, 2000
 Mothlight, Rich Women of Zurich, London, 1999
 Glass Box Gallery, Salford, Greater Manchester, 1998
 Certosa di Calci/Museum of Natural History, Pisa, 1998
 Mind’s Eye, Hotbath Gallery, Bath, 1997
 Fire, Ice & Steam, Middlesbrough Gallery, Cleveland, 1995
 Vortex, Prema Arts Centre, Uley, Gloucester, 1995
 Perpetual Motion, Saw Contemporary Arts Centre. Ottawa, 1994
 Heaven & Earth, London Film-Maker's Co-op, 1992

Major curatorial projects

 Digital Aesthetic (2001, 2007 and 2012), a collaborative exhibition between the University of Central Lancashire and the Harris Museum & Art Gallery. 
 Yes Snow Show (2008-2009), an exhibition of work by filmmaker Michael Snow, co-curated with Elisabetta Fabrizzi, British Film Institute, London.
 Analogue: Pioneering Video from the UK, Canada and Poland: 1968-88, a touring exhibition co-curated with Catherine Elwes, Tate Britain & Tate Modern, London, Foundation for Art & Creative Technology, Liverpool, The Norwich Gallery, The Centre for Contemporary Art, Ujazdowski Castle, Warsaw, St James Cavalier Centre for Creativity, Valletta, MOCCA (Museum of Contemporary Canadian Art) Toronto, Arsenal Cinema, Berlin (2006–08);  Ontario, Canada: Ottawa, Peterborough, Sarnia, Waterloo and Windsor (2008-2010).

Bibliography

 Video-tapes, Installations, CD Roms 1978-1997, Chris Meigh-Andrews, University of Central Lancashire, 1998
 Video Installations, 1998/2004, Chris Meigh-Andrews, University of Central Lancashire, 2005
 Analogue: Pioneering Video from the UK, Canada and Poland (1968-88) - Catherine Elwes and Chris Meigh-Andrews, editors, EDAU, Preston, 2006 
 Digital Aesthetic 2, Chris Meigh-Andrews, University of Central Lancashire, The Electronic and Digital Art Unit, 2008
 A History of Video Art: The Development of Form and Function, Chris Meigh-Andrews, Berg, Oxford and New York, 2006
 A History of Video Art (Revised Edition), Chris Meigh-Andrews, Bloomsbury London, 2013
 A History of Video Art (Japanese Edition), Chris Meigh-Andrews, translated by Shinsuke Ina, Sangensha, Tokyo 2013

He has also contributed to larger edited works, including:

 “Chris Meigh-Andrews, Sculptural & Video Installations: 1989-95”, Experiments in Moving Image, Jackie Hatfield and Steve Littman, editors, Steve Epigraph Publications, London, 2004
 “Chris Meigh-Andrews: Early Video Tapes: 1978-87”, Experimental Film and Video, Jackie Hatfield, editor, John Libby Publishing, 2006
 “The Vasulka Tapes”, Vasulka Lab 1969-2005-Live Archive, Vivid, Birmingham, 2006 
 “Interwoven Motion: steps towards a semi-permanent outdoor self-powered video installation”, The Itemisation of Creative Knowledge, Clive Gillman, editor, FACT/ Liverpool University Press, 2006 
 “Peter Campus”, 100 Video Artists, Rosa Olivares, editor, Exit Publications, Madrid, 2010
 “Video Installation in Europe and the USA: The Expansion and Exploration of Electronic and Televisual Space: 1968-1988”, Expanded Cinema: Film Art Performance, Tate Publications, London, 2011
 “Optiks: Peter Campus”, and “In Conversation with Michael Snow”, The BFI Gallery Book, British Film Institute, London 2011
 “Location & Dislocation, Site & Architecture: Video Installation by Palestinian Artists” in  Palestinian Video Art: Constellation of the Moving Image, ed. Bashir Makhoul, Palestinian Art Court-al Hoash, Jerusalem, 2013

References

External links
 Official Website
 The Minories Galleries website with details of the exhibition "Sculpting with Light & Time: Video and Installations 1978-2014"

British video artists
Living people
1952 births
Alumni of the Royal College of Art
Artist authors
Academics of the Royal College of Art
Alumni of Goldsmiths, University of London
Alumni of the London College of Printing